The Charles B. Wang Community Health Center (CBWCHC), founded in 1971, is a nonprofit organization and Federally Qualified Health Center. The Health Center provides primary health care to members of the community with a focus on Asian Americans. There are locations in Lower Manhattan and Flushing, Queens, all of which are opened 7 days a week. In 2016, the Health Center served more than 52,000 patients and 280,000 service visits. The Health Center's staff are fluent in Mandarin, Cantonese, Taishanese, Shanghainese, Hokkien, Vietnamese, and Korean. The Health Center serves all patients regardless of language, culture or ability to pay.

History
CBWCHC started in 1971 by a group of volunteers who organized the Chinatown Health Fair to provide health education and screenings to the medically underserved Chinese community in New York City. About 2,500 community members participated in the fair. Following the tremendous community response, the volunteers organized a free clinic in space donated by the Church of Our Savior on Henry Street.

As the free clinic grew, donations funded the expansion to a new location at 89 Baxter Street in 1979. With this new location, more patients were being seen and treated. This new location was opened seven days a week with a full staff of doctors and nurses. Now with a stable structure, patients were able to return for check-ups and continual care.

As part of the Lyndon Johnson Administration's War on Poverty, neighborhood health centers were created to provide health and social services in poor and underserved communities. Through the 1970s, Congress authorized funding for community, migrant, and public housing health centers. In 1989, Congress passed the Omnibus Budget Reconciliation Act which consolidated these funding streams and created the Federally Qualified Health Centers (FQHC) program. This allowed qualified health centers to fully cover the cost of treating uninsured patients. With this Public Health Service Act, the Health Center was more capable of providing care to a larger scope of the community.

Services

References

External links

1971 establishments in New York City
Chinatown, Manhattan
Clinics in New York City
Flushing, Queens
Health centers
Healthcare in New York City
Medical and health organizations based in New York City
Organizations established in 1971